Nordisk Film A/S (lit. "Nordic Film") is a  Danish entertainment company established in 1906 in Copenhagen by filmmaker Ole Olsen. It is the fourth-oldest film studio in the world behind the Gaumont Film Company,   Pathé,    and Titanus, and the oldest studio to be continuously active.

History
Olsen started his company in the Copenhagen suburb of Valby under the name "Ole Olsen's Film Factory," but soon changed it to the Nordisk Film company.

In 1908, Olsen opened an affiliate branch in New York, the Great Northern Film Company, to handle the distribution of his films to the American market. In 1909, having been excluded from the MPPC cartel in the United States, which Olsen had hoped to join, Nordisk participated in the Paris Film Congress in a failed attempt by major European producers to form a similar monopoly. As Nordisk Film, it became a publicly traded company in 1911. 

In 1992, it merged with the Egmont media group, operating as electronic media production and distribution group. The total revenues in 2018 amounted to approximately €559 million. 
Nordisk Film is the oldest movie production company in operation in the world. Egmont Nordisk Film is the largest producer and distributor of electronic entertainment in the Nordic region.

Operations
The company produces and co-produces national and international feature films in Denmark, Norway and Sweden, which are distributed to cinemas around the Nordic countries, including Nordisk Film Cinemas in Denmark, Norway and Sweden. The films are also distributed internationally for viewing in cinemas, on video and on television.

Furthermore, Nordisk Film produces games through a number of game studios invested in by Nordisk Film Games, distributes PlayStation in the Nordic and Baltic countries and develops global digital gifting solutions through GoGift. 

Through the Nordisk Film Foundation, Nordisk Film develops new talent. With an annual budget of approx. DKK 5 million, the Nordisk Film Foundation has also contributed to the development of the Danish film industry over the last 20 years by offering scholarships, project grants and awards. In 2017, the Nordisk Film Foundation launched the one-day tech conference PictureThis_.

Business Areas

Nordisk Film Production
Nordisk Film Production is a prolific producer of film and TV content, with a strong focus on the Scandinavian market. They have a hand in roughly 15 productions per year, spanning a range of formats and genres. The overall strategy for Nordisk Film Production is the same as when the company was founded: to entertain a broad audience. Nordisk Film Production produces feature films, animation films, short films, TV series, and TV documentaries for the Scandinavian and international market.

In October 2009, Nordisk sold its TV production unit to the Banijay Group.

Nordisk Film Distribution
Nordisk Film Distribution handles and distributes the rights to own productions, a number of local films as well as independent productions. Nordisk Film is behind approximately one in every five theatrical films and their Distribution is a major player in the Nordic countries.  Their associated company TrustNordisk is one of the largest sales agents in Europe and the leading expert when it comes to Scandinavian feature films and series worldwide.

Nordisk Film Interactive
Nordisk Film Interactive has exclusive distribution rights to Sony PlayStation products in the Nordic countries, and is thereby responsible for a substantial business area in Nordisk Film.

Nordisk Film Cinemas
Nordisk Film Cinemas is the leading cinema chain in Denmark and Norway, expanding to Sweden as well. They have approximately ten million cinema guests per year.

GoGift
GoGift is a gifting company within Nordisk Film that offers unique gifting solutions for both B2B and B2C.

Nordisk Games
Nordisk Games invests in Nordic game studios. Nordisk Games has invested in six game companies: Avalanche Studios Group, Flashbulb Games, Multiverse, Raw Fury, Reto-Moto and Star Stable Entertainment. 

On May 30, 2018 it was announced that Nordisk Film had acquired Avalanche Studios.

In December 2020, Nordisk Film, under their Nordisk Games division, purchased a 40% stake ownership of Spanish company, MercurySteam.

In March 2021, Nordisk Film, under their Nordisk Games division, purchased a 30.7% stake of Supermassive Games, increasing to full 100% ownership in July 2022.

Feature films
 The Crow (TBA; distribution in Scandinavia only)
 Sisu (2022; distribution in Scandinavia only; internationally distributed by Sony Pictures Worldwide Acquisitions)
 Dog (2022; Danish distribution only; produced by Metro-Goldwyn-Mayer and FilmNation Entertainment)
 The Tunnel (2019)
 Midsommar (2019; co-production and distribution in Scandinavia)
 Checkered Ninja (2018)
 The Reunion 3 - The Baptism (2016) 
 Animals United (2016)
 Al-Medina (2015)
 Key House Mirror (2015)
 A War (2015) 
 April 9th (2015)
 Testament of Youth (2015)
 When Animals Dream (2014)
 The Reunion 2 – The Funeral (2014)
 The Cartel (2014)
 Speed Walking (2014)
 Sorrow and Joy (2013) 
 The Olsen Gang in Deep Trouble (2013)
 Sex, Drugs and Taxation (co-pro) (2013)
 Nordvest (2013)
 Kon-Tiki (2013)
 A Hijacking (2012) 
 The Reunion (2011) 
 A Funny Man (2011)
 Ronal the Barbarian (2011)
Mugge Og Vejfesten (2019)
 Olsen Gang gets polished (2010)
 R (2010)
 Rejsen til Saturn (2008)
 Jungledyret Hugo 3: Fræk, flabet, og fri (2007)
 Quest for a Heart (2007)
 Terkel in Trouble (2004)
 Help! I'm a Fish (2000)
 Hard Rain (1998; co-production and distribution in Scandinavia)
 Jungledyret Hugo 2: Den store filmhelt (1996)
 Aberne og det hemmelige våben (1995)
 Jungledyret Hugo (1993)
 Fuglekrigen i Kanøfleskoven (1990)
 Præsidenten (1919)

Other filmsVengeance Vs. Love, a scene from the film appeared on the cover of the January 6, 1912 edition of  Moving Picture NewsThe Inevitable Johnson (1912), a comedyThe Waterfalls of Sweden (1912)A Summer Flirtation (1912), a comedy

TV-series
 The Team (2015)
 Första Kärleken (1992)
 BECK (1997–2015) 
 Arne Dahl (co-pro) (2015)
 Jungledyret Hugo'' (2002-2003)

References

External links
 
 

Film production companies of Denmark
Television production companies of Denmark
Mass media companies based in Copenhagen
Mass media companies established in 1906
Danish companies established in 1906
Film distributors
Valby
Danish film studios
Companies based in Copenhagen Municipality